The Fremantle Workers Social and Leisure Club is a social non-profit organisation in Fremantle, Western Australia. It was established in 1914 as a working men's club, when a need was felt for a social (and non-religious) meeting place for the stevedores working on the wharves. Its original purposes included educational lectures, a library of democratic literature, as well as games and entertainment.

History
The Club was established in early 1914. It began life at 1 Henry Street, Fremantle in what was Lodge's Hotel; it bought this property in 1916. The first meeting was held on 2 February 1914 with William Roche as president. All committee members were unionists.

It is tradition within the Club to refer to a man named Billy Clare as the "founder" and first president of the club, however this is not reflected in the historical record. Clare was certainly a foundation (and later life) member, but was not part of the initial committee.

The club was profitable in the late 1920s, allowing it to donate to the Fremantle Hospital.

Renovations were conducted in 1932, and cost £3,500.  The Club reopened on 13 April 1932, when the membership count stood at 3,400 people.

The club commenced operation from the clubrooms of the South Fremantle Football Club on 19 November 2014.

On 9 November 2014 a booklet entitled The Fremantle Workers Social and Leisure Club 1914–2014: Celebrating 100 Years was launched (by Melissa Parke, MP). It was written by Deborah Gare (professor of history at University of Notre Dame Australia) and Jane Davis.

References

External links
 

Working men's clubs
Clubs and societies in Western Australia
Henry Street, Fremantle